The 2017–18 AEK B.C. season is AEK's 61st season in the top-tier level Greek Basket League. AEK won the Greek basketball cup and Basketball Champions League on that season.

Transfers 2017–18

Players In

|}

Players Out

|}

Preseason and friendlies

Competitions

Overall

Overview

Greek League

League table

Results summary

Results by round

Regular season

Results overview

Quarterfinals

Greek Cup

 Quarterfinals

 Semifinals

 Final

FIBA Champions League

Regular season - Group C

Results summary

Results by round

Regular season

Results overview

Round of 16

Quarterfinals

Final Four

References 

AEK B.C. seasons
2017–18 in European basketball by club